Shanghai Dramatic Arts Centre is a professional theatrical company based in Shanghai, China, founded on January 23, 1995 after the merger of Shanghai's two largest theatres, the Shanghai People's Art Theatre and the Shanghai Youth Drama Troupe. Its founders are Xia Yan, Huang Zuolin and Xiong Foxi. Currently, its contracted actors include Michael Chen, Ryan Cheng, Xu Zheng and Ma Yili.

References

External links
 

1995 establishments in China
Theatre companies in Shanghai
Organizations based in Shanghai
Culture in Shanghai